Isabella II (12124 May 1228), also known as Yolande of Brienne, was a princess of French origin, the daughter of Maria, the queen-regnant of Jerusalem, and her husband, John of Brienne. She was reigning Queen of Jerusalem from 1212 until her death in 1228. By marriage to Frederick II, Holy Roman Emperor, Isabella also became Holy Roman Empress and Queen of Sicily and Germany.

Infant Queen
Isabella II was born in Andria, in the southern Italian Kingdom of Sicily. She was the only child of Maria of Montferrat, Queen of Jerusalem, and John of Brienne. Maria was the daughter of Queen Isabella I of Jerusalem by her second husband Conrad I, and heiress, on her mother's death, of the Kingdom of Jerusalem.

Maria died shortly after giving birth to Isabella II in 1212, possibly by puerperal fever. Because of this, Isabella II was proclaimed Queen of Jerusalem when she was only a few days old. Because her father John did not have a direct claim on the throne, he ruled as regent.

Marriage with Frederick II

During a meeting between John of Brienne, Pope Honorius III and Frederick II in the city of Ferentino in 1223, Isabella's fate was decided: Frederick accepted to finally go to the Crusade, but only as the legitimate King of Jerusalem, and this was only possible if he agreed to take the young Queen Isabella II as his wife (by this time, Frederick was a widower). This was planned by the Pope, who hoped by this bond to attach the Emperor firmly to the Sixth Crusade. The betrothal was confirmed, but the Emperor still delayed his departure until August 1225, when he and Isabella were married by proxy in the City of Acre. Days later, Isabella II was crowned as Queen of Jerusalem.

Isabella arrived in Italy with twenty galleys sent by Frederick II to bring her to her father and married in person to Frederick II in the cathedral of Brindisi, on 9 November 1225. During the ceremony, Frederick declared himself King of Jerusalem and immediately saw to it that his new father-in-law John of Brienne, the current regent of Jerusalem, was dispossessed and his rights transferred to him. The contemporary chronicles described the exotic wedding celebrations, which took place in the Castle of Oria, and the indignant reaction of her father John of Brienne, now without royal authority.

Death
After the wedding, Isabella was kept in seclusion by her husband, in Palermo. Aged 14, in November 1226, she gave birth to her first child, a daughter (referred to by some sources as Margaret); the baby died in August 1227. On 25 April 1228 Isabella gave birth to her second child, a son, Conrad, in Andria, Bari, but a few days later, on 4 May, she died following childbirth complications. She was buried in the Andria Cathedral.

Ancestry

Notes

References

Uwe A. Oster: Die Frauen Kaiser Friedrichs II, Piper, Munich 2008.
Jacqueline Alio: Queens of Sicily 1061-1266, Trinacria, New York 2018.
Alberto Gentile: LE QUATTRO MOGLI DI FEDERICO II: FRA MITO E REALTÀ (Italian) in stupormundi.it [retrieved 22 May 2014].

|-

|-

1212 births
1228 deaths
13th-century kings of Jerusalem
13th-century women rulers
13th-century women of the Holy Roman Empire
Queens regnant of Jerusalem
15th-century Italian women
Holy Roman Empresses
Italian queens consort
German queens consort
Royal consorts of Sicily
Medieval child monarchs
House of Brienne
Wives of Frederick II, Holy Roman Emperor
Deaths in childbirth
15th-century Sicilian people